Little and Broad Haven Lifeboat Station is a Royal National Lifeboat Institution (RNLI) lifeboat station in Pembrokeshire, West Wales. The station was opened in 1882 at Little Haven where it operated until 1921. It reopened in 1967 under its present name, and serves the area in St Bride's Bay surrounding Little Haven and Broad Haven resorts. When it was built it was the RNLI's smallest lifeboat station.

The station operates a  inshore lifeboat, launched by tractor and trailer.

History
When the RNLI first established the station in 1882 the lifeboat was kept afloat under the shelter of Goldtrop Head. In 1903 a boathouse and slipway were built. By 1921 there was reduced need for the service and the station closed with cover available from St Davids and Angle.

By 1967, with the increase of pleasure boating and the development of the local holiday beaches, the RNLI reopened the station in a boathouse built by the Rural District Council. A dedicated boathouse was built in 1982.

The station has had its own fundraising branch since 1975 which, with the station's souvenir shop, has raised over £350,000.

Honours
1995 - RNLI Bronze Medal to Helmsman Crispin Williamson and Thanks on Vellum to Brian Dilly and David Love for their rescue of a family of six
2004 - Thanks on Vellum to Helmsman Crispin Williamson for the rescue of three children

Fleet

See also
Royal National Lifeboat Institution
List of RNLI stations

References

External links

Lifeboat stations in Wales
Transport infrastructure completed in 1882